St. Gregory College of Valenzuela (formerly St. Gregory School of Valenzuela) is a private school in Valenzuela City established in 2007. It is located at #162 P. Faustino St., Punturin, Valenzuela City, Philippines. It cater to students from kindergarten through senior high school.

See also
 Division of City Schools–Valenzuela
 Punturin, Valenzuela

References

External links 
 St. Gregory College of Valenzuela's Official Facebook Page

Private schools in Metro Manila
Schools in Valenzuela, Metro Manila
Educational institutions established in 2007
2007 establishments in the Philippines